The 1946 Campeonato Argentino de Rugby was won by the selection della Buenos Aires Province ("Provincia") that beat in the final the selection of Capital.

Rugby Union in Argentina in 1946
 The "Championship of Buenos Aires" was won by Club Pucará
 The "Cordoba Province Championship" was won by Jockey Club Córdoba
 The North-East Championship was won by Universitario

Results 

,

Final 

Capital: A. Ozores (GEBA) (cap)., T. C. Sacca (Belgrano), R. D. H. Brown (Belgrano), J.Sansot (C.U.B.A.), y A. Fernández Moores (C.U.B.A.), E. Monpelat (C.U.B.A.), E. Holmberg (C.U.B.A., L. M. Bertani (GEBA), R. MacKay (GEBA), E. Lucotti (Belgrano), H.Ponce (GEBA), C. B: Ardió (C.U.B.A.), F. Elizalde (C.U.B.A.), H. Achával (C.U.B.A.), R.Lucotti (Belgrano) 
Provincia R. Frigerio (Pucará), V. Bereciartúa (Pucará), A. Palma (Pucará), J. C. de Pablo (Pucará), H. Castro Feijóo (C.A.S.I.), R. E. Giles (Pucará), G. Ehrmann (Pucará), E. Fonseca (Pucará), J. Sarandón (S.I.C.), B. Grigolón (Hindú), A. González Bonorino (Olivos), J. Morganti (C.A.San Isidro), E. Daulte (Olivos), J. Bastiani (Hindú) cap., A. Gutiérrez (Hindú)

Bibliography 
  Memorias de la UAR 1946
  II Campeonato Argentino

Campeonato Argentino de Rugby
Argentina
Campeonato